Graeme John (born 15 March 1943) is a businessman who was managing director of Australia Post from 1993 to 2009.  From 1990 was Australia Post's Chief Manager of National Operations.
John was awarded the Officer of the Order of Australia (AO) in 2003, for service to business and to the community. He is also a recipient of the Centennial Medal and the Australian Sports Medal. He is a fellow of the Chartered Institute of Logistics and Transport and a member of the Australian Institute of Company Directors. He is a board member of Aurizon, Racing Victoria and Seven West Media. 

He is a former chairman of the board of the Kahala Posts Group, board member of the International Post Corporation (Netherlands), and vice-chairman of Sai Cheng Logistics International (China), a joint venture with China Post.

John played for, and later coached, the South Melbourne Football Club in the Victorian Football League. He played at centre-half-forward for both the Western Australian and Victorian state teams and gained selection in the All-Australian team in 1966. He was nominated for the Swans "Team of The Century". Off the field John has also served as president of the South Melbourne Football Club and served as an Australian Football League commissioner until 2011.

He is the father of Rebecca John, Andrea John, and Gareth John, a ruckman who played for the Sydney Swans.

References

Sydney Swans players
Sydney Swans coaches
East Perth Football Club players
All-Australians (1953–1988)
Living people
1943 births
Australian businesspeople
Sydney Swans administrators
Australian rules footballers from Western Australia